The Argiles de Châtillon is a geologic formation in France. It preserves fossils dating back to the Jurassic period.  Dinosaur remains are among the fossils that have been recovered from the formation, although none have yet been referred to a specific genus.

See also

 List of fossiliferous stratigraphic units in France
 List of dinosaur-bearing rock formations
 List of stratigraphic units with indeterminate dinosaur fossils

Footnotes

References
 Weishampel, David B.; Dodson, Peter; and Osmólska, Halszka (eds.): The Dinosauria, 2nd, Berkeley: University of California Press. 861 pp. .
 

Kimmeridgian Stage
Jurassic France